Meng Liu Foon (born ) is a New Zealand politician who served as the mayor of Gisborne from 2001 to 2019. Since August 2019, he has been New Zealand's race relations commissioner. He is one of a handful of people of Chinese descent to have become a mayor in New Zealand. He is fluent in English, Cantonese and Māori. At the time of his departure from the mayoral position he was the only mayor in New Zealand who was fluent in Māori.

Childhood and education
Meng Foon was born in August 1959 in Gisborne in New Zealand's North Island. His mother is Ng Heng Kiu (Helen) of Hong Kong and his father is Liu Sui Kai (George) of Guangzhou. Foon's parents were market gardeners who operated a vegetable shop in Gisborne. Foon also has a brother.

From the age of seven, Foon began working at his family's vegetable shop. Foon and his younger brother attended school while working in the morning, lunch break, and after school at the family business. While working at his family business, Foon developed an interest in languages and accents; eventually becoming fluent in English, Cantonese, and the  Māori language.

Education
Foon attended Makaraka School where he was exposed to Māori culture including flax making and the haka war dance. Foon later attended Gisborne Intermediate School and Gisborne Boys' High School. Foon studied English, social studies, the sciences, physical education and the Māori language at Gisborne Boys' High School. Foon also played rugby at High School. Foon left high school at Sixth Form to help run his family's market garden business.

Business career
Foon expanded his family's market garden business into several shops. During the 1960s, Foon and his family also bought Gisborne's Kaiti Mall and opened a liquor shop called TAB. In 1985, Foon's parents retired and emigrated to Sydney, Australia before retiring in Hong Kong. Meng, his brother, and their wives subsequently took over the family business.

In 2018, Foon and his relatives sold Kaiti Mall. By that time, Kaiti Mall's land and buildings were estimated to be worth NZ$3.8 million. By 2018, Kaiti Mall had 12 tenants including businesses, government, and commercial tenants.

Local government career
In 1995, Foon stood as councillor for the Gisborne District Council's Patutahi Taruheru ward at the encouragement of two detectives. At the time, the incumbent councillor Owen Pinching had announced his retirement. Foon won the 1995 local election and was elected to the Patutahi Taruheru ward.

In 1998, Foon unsuccessfully ran for the position of Mayor of Gisborne. In 2001, Foon ran again for the Gisborne mayoralty and was successfully elected. During the mayoral campaign, he highlighted his family values, business acumen, Māori language fluency, and financial management skills. He was the first person to serve five consecutive terms as Gisborne mayor since Harry Barker retired in 1977. In 2016, Foon won his sixth consecutive term as mayor of the Gisborne District, defeating three other candidates. His mayoralty extended across New Zealand's easternmost province with the largest proportion of native Maori population (45% according to the 2013 New Zealand census).

Following confirmation of the Ngāti Porou deal, arranged under the controversial Foreshore and Seabed Act 2004, Foon was quoted as saying that "he did not believe many people would be disadvantaged by reduced access to the beach, as 90 per cent of the East Coast population was Maori anyway." Foon announced in March 2019 that he would not stand again in the 2019 local elections.

On 8 August 2019, the Gisborne District Council voted unanimously to appoint the deputy mayor, Rehette Stoltz, as mayor when Foon formally resigned on 22 August 2019.

Race Relations Commissioner
In July 2019, Justice Minister Andrew Little confirmed that Foon had been appointed as the new Race Relations Commissioner, with his term commencing on 26 August 2019.

In early November 2020, Foon as Race Relations Commissioner defended Foreign Minister Nanaia Mahuta's kauae moko facial tattoos after right-wing blogger Olivier Pierson mocked them as the "height of ugly, uncivilised wokedom." Foon stated that Mahuta's kauae moko was special to Māori and should be celebrated. He also urged people to abandon their racism and prejudices and to accept that the world is changing and that the Māori economy is growing.

In March 2021, Meng Foon added his voice to those calling for an end to the reality show Police Ten 7 - which sparked controversy. Meng Foon later withdrew his statement.

Personal life and family
Foon has several interests outside of politics. He has released a musical number, Tu Mai, which includes various native tracks, he has been chair of Gisborne/Tarawhiti Rugby League since 2007, and is a board member of the New Zealand Rugby League board.

At the age of 21, Foon married his wife Ying, who was 20 years old at the time. The couple have two daughters named Amanda and Jessica and a son named Nathan. They also have a grandson named Toby through one of their daughters.

See also
Peter Chin, Mayor of Dunedin

References 

New Zealand people of Chinese descent
Mayors of Gisborne, New Zealand
Living people
New Zealand rugby league administrators
Rugby league in the Gisborne-East Coast district
New Zealand Rugby League board members
Year of birth missing (living people)